Nadiad is a city in the state of Gujarat, India and the administrative centre of the Kheda district. The city is managed by the Nadiad Municipality. It is known for the Santram Mandir, the Mai Mandir, the historic Swaminarayan temple built in 1824, and the Anand and Hari Om Ashram. Nadiad is also where Shrimad Rajchandra composed Shri Atmasiddhi Shatra, a 142 verse spiritual treatise in 1895. It has a major railway junction and is a main station on the Ahmedabad-Mumbai route. It is the  birthplace of Sardar Vallabhbhai Patel, the first Deputy Prime Minister of India. Nadiad Municipality was Founded in 1866.

History
There is a belief that the old name of Nadiad was Natpur or Natdra, and this town was settled by the Nat people. Indulal Yagnik wrote in his autobiography that in the last century, who would deny that Desai and Nagars had played a strange game of miraculous theatrics of politics on the stage of Mahagujarat? Below the Derasar idol of Rupa Parekh's Pol of Nadiad is the name Natiadra, which shows that the existence of Nadiad will be in the name of Natiadra in the period from 9 to 129 AD. Remains of this city have been found around Bhairavna temple on Dakor Road around AD 7. The author of 'Narsanda Darshan' has mentioned the name of Nadiad as 'Naginabad'. In the year 2002, Muslim historians refer to Nadiad as "Islamabad".
 
If the word Saksharbhoomi is heard in the ears of any Gujarati anywhere in the world, then he will understand the exact mention of Nadiad. There are nine literates here, which means that there are not as many writers in other cities as 5th Nadiad? Nadiad was becoming the center of literary and cultural activities in Gujarat in the late 19th century, i.e. between 150 and 1800 AD. In 1918, English domination was established in Gujarat and higher education of universities was started. In this way, through the connection with English education, English language and English culture, English Gujaratis, especially the Suratis, started the reform movement. At this time, Nadiad became the center for the preservation of Indian culture and heritage. In that era of kingdoms, four friends from here, Manasukhram Tripathi, Manibhai Jashbhai, Haridas Viharidas Desai (Bhau Saheb) and Ranchodram Udayaram's congregation were persecuted in many princely states from Mumbai to Kutch for their skill, study and diplomacy. Indulal Yagnik notes that taking advantage of Manasukhraya and Haridas, many Desais and citizens of Nadiad entered several states and became rich through Satadhari. In this way, the literate people of Nadiad, shining with the triple splendor of Lakshmi, Saraswati and Rajasthan, studied Indian and English culture in such a detailed manner that nowhere else in Gujarat. Thus, the protection of Arya Sanskrit is getting the pride of literacy even today as a result of the smoke which Kaj Nadiad smoked. In Nadiad, nine literates simultaneously spread their literary talents all over Gujarat. Gujarati literature has made a name for itself in world literature with the novel Saraswati Chandra by Govardhanram Tripathi. On this occasion, Manasukhram Tripathi, Zaverilal Umiyashankar Yagnik, Dolatram Kriparam Pandya, Balashankar Ullasram Kantharia, Manilal Nabhubhai Dwivedi, Chhaganlal Harilal Pandya, Ambalal Bulakhiram Jani, Champashankar Narmadashankar Pandya and Moolshankar Maneklal Yagnik were named as the nine literates of Nadiad. For this Nadiad with nine divisions, nine gates, nine lakes, Gujarat Urmikavi Nhanalal has rightly said that Gujarat was looking for literacy in the whole of Nadiad.
 
More than 270 writers from Nadiad, whose birthplace, karma bhoomi or homeland have been living in this land. Perhaps in the middle class towns of Gujarat, such and such writers have not been found anywhere else. Is. Mogul Azam's popular song Pankit Mohe Nadhat Pe Nandlal Nadiad's Rasakavi Radhunath Brahmbhat has written. Nadiad is the hometown of the poet Vindhalbhai 5tel, who sang a lie in Bobby, a successful surgeon from Rajakpur. Gujarat's legendary comedian Bakul Tripathi, well-known poet-writer Pururaj Joshi and successful storyteller Evadev are also from Nadiad. Indulal Yagnik, Jashwant Thacker, Maganbhai Desai, D.B. Govindbhai Desai, Desaibhai Nathabhai 5tel, Prabodh 5rikh, Pu.Mota, Mahesh Chanlal, Krishnashankar Shastri (Pu.Dadaji) are some of the creators who have gifted this land. Out of these two and a half hundred and fifty writers, 24 creators are found from the same path, while the fragrance of many other great creators is lingering in the alleys of Nadiad. Introduced in books like Nadiad's Akshardeh and A.Sau. Will be available from a permanent exhibition held at the Dahilakshmi Library.
 
Apart from literacy, Nadiad is also known as the village of Jai Maharaj. Because 150 years ago today, Dattatreya Swaru Yogiraj Avadhut Santram Maharaj lived here and spread the light of divine light. This Santram Maharaj has composed the best poems of Gyanbhakti under the name of Sukhsagar and many other poets of his saintly life have also given the best poems. In this context, the land of Nadiad has also given birth to Veer Vindhalbhai and Sardar Patel, the sculptor of united India. In this sense, Nadiad is becoming a fertile ground for creators and grandchildren.

Climate

Attractions
Santram Mandir is located in the center of the town. It is known for its charity work. This old temple is visited by people on the day of full moon. Marida Darwaja and Amdavadi Darwaja are also nearby.

Shri Atmasiddhi Shastra Rachnabhoomi 
Shri Atmasiddhishastra Rachnabhoomi is a beautiful memorial that stands at the sanctified site of the creation of Shri Atmasiddhi Shastra in Nadiad. This is where Shri Atmasiddhi Shastra, a magnum opus of spirituality was composed by Shrimad Rajchandra, a great saint, poet and philosopher in 1895. 

Shrimad Rajchandra composed the poetic version of the 6 fundamental truths of the Soul (which he had originally penned in a letter to Lallujiswami in 1893) called Shri Atmasiddhi Shastra in simple language, which could be easily understood and memorized.When Shrimad Rajchandra was in Nadiad, Ambalalbhai had remained at his service throughout the trip. Once Shrimadji came back from a walk around the lake (which has now been transformed into the Jalmandir), he called for Ambalalbhai to bring a lantern and then he started writing Shri Atmasiddhi Shastra. 

When the composition of 142 verses was finished in little over 90 minutes, it was handed over to Ambalalbhai with the instructions to prepare four copies and to send them to three other people and one for himself. One was for Saubhagyabhai, one for Ambalalbhai, one for Lallujiswami and one for Maneklal Ghelabhai Zaveri. 

Shri Atmasiddhi Shastra Rachnabhoomi has been restored by Shrimad Rajchandra Mission Dharampur using the original brick wall to preserve the holy vibrations and stay true to the era. Life-sized statues of Shrimadji and Ambalalbhai have been placed in the room, in the same stance as when the scripture was penned. Shrimad Rajchandra Mission Dharampur also beautified the lake and consecrated a five-foot three-inch idol of Shrimad Rajchandra in the centre. A walking track has been constructed around the lake for the community and visitors which provides a peaceful ambience to contemplate on the self.

Transport
Nadiad is Well Connected With Railway and Road Transport. Nadiad Junction railway station is Major Railway Station in Kheda District and Indian Railways's "A" Category Railway Station Located in Ahmedabad-Mumbai Main Line. Nadiad has two extra lines. One goes to Modasa and other one goes to Petlad. Nadiad Junction railway station has four platforms. Indian Railway is going to extend Modasa Line to Shamlaji. Nadiad has a major bus stand. Nadiad is Zonal Division in Charotar Region. Anand, Mahemdavad, Kapadvanj, Dakor, Mahudha, Borsad, Khambhat bus depot's Are Under Nadiad Division. Nadiad Division is Called by Amul. Nadiad is well connected to Ahmedabad, Vadodara, Gandhinagar, Surat, Rajkot by bus. Other interstate services are operated by Nadiad Division from Nadiad. Nearest airport is Sardar Vallabhbhai Patel International Airport located in Ahmedabad and it is 65 km away from Nadiad.

Demography

As per provisional reports of Census India, population of Nadiad in 2011 is 218,095; of which male and female are 112,311 and 105,784 respectively. Although Nadiad city has population of 218,095; its urban / metropolitan population is 225,071 of which 115,903 are males and 109,168 are females.

Notable people

 Mansukhram Tripathi (1840 – 1907), Gujarati writer
 Govardhanram Tripathi (1855 – 1907), Indian novelist, author of the epic Gujarati novel Saraswatichandra
 Balashankar Kantharia (1858 – 1898), Gujarati poet
 Manilal Dwivedi  (1858 – 1898), Gujarati writer
 Vallabhbhai Patel (1875 – 1950),Freedom Fighter,Indian politician,First Home Minister of Independent India
 Indulal Yagnik (1892 – 1972), Indian freedom fighter and writer, led Mahagujarat movement demanding separate statehood to Gujarat
 Bakul Tripathi (1928 – 2006), Indian humorist
 Dinsha Patel (born 1937), Indian politician
 Amar Gupta (born 1953), Indian computer scientist
 Praful Patel (born 1957), Indian politician and businessman
 Axar Patel (born 1994), Indian cricketer (Spin Allrounder)
 Babubhai Patel, Indian politician
 Vishvesh Parmar, Indian singer
 Abdul Karim Nadiadwala, Indian film producer, grandfather of Sajid Nadiadwala
 Mohsin Khan, Indian Television Actor

Education 
Some of the educational institutes located in Nadiad are:
New English School(Gujarati Medium) and English Teaching School(English Medium)
 Dharamsinh Desai University
 C. B. Patel Arts College
 Uni Trust Surajba Mahila Arts College
 Nadiad Ayurveda College
 J & J College of Science
 Dinsha Patel College of Nursing
 Dr.N.D.Desai Faculty Of Medical Science And Research
 t.j patel commerce college

References

External links

 Nadiad Nagarpalika (Municipality)
 Bus services from Nadiad

Cities and towns in Kheda district